The Legacy of Shi is the second studio album from French heavy metal and hardcore punk band Rise of the Northstar. It was released on October 19, 2018, through SharpTone Records in the United States, and everywhere else on Nuclear Blast. The album was co-produced by Rise of the Northstar and Joe Duplantier of Gojira.

Critical reception

The album has been generally given positive reviews.

Punknews.org writer Michael Hawkins praised the album as a whole by saying "Northstar have lost none of their impact, only reinforced it. This time around, the record feels more like a whole, something to be experienced from beginning to end. Vocalist Vithia echoes this in his lyrics, a concept album story of becoming possessed by a Japanese demon, or yōkai." He concludes in his review "The Legacy of Shi is a monumental achievement for Rise of the Northstar – one that's made even more impressive by the band's drive to create music on their own terms. This feeling of victory is a palpable one, present on every track of the album. I think the chant throughout "This Is Crossover" sums Rise of the Northstar's attitude up perfectly: This is crossover. Northstar FOREVER."

Track listing

Personnel
Adapted from the liner notes of The Legacy of Shi.

Rise of the Northstar
 Vithia – vocals
 Eva-B – lead guitar
 Air One – rhythm guitar
 Fabulous Fab – bass guitar
 Phantom – drums

Production
 Joe Duplantier – recorded by, producer, engineer 
 Rise of the Northstar – producer, engineer
 Jami Uertz – recorded by, engineer
 Johann Meyer – recorded by, engineer, mixer
 Vithia – art direction, design, layout
 Ted Jensen – mastering engineer

Charts

References

External links

2018 albums
Groove metal albums
Rise of the Northstar albums
Nuclear Blast albums